Minoo ( meaning paradise, heaven) is a Persian given name for girls in Iran, South Asia and Central Asia. People with this name include:

Given name
 Minoo Akhtarzand (born 1956), Iranian-Swedish civil servant
 Minoo Khaleghi (born 1985), Iranian jurist
 Minoo Lenarz (1966–2015), Iranian-German medical scientist
 Minoo Masani (1905–1998), Indian politician
 Minoo Moallem, Iranian-American academic
 Minoo Mohraz (born 1946), Iranian physician, researcher and AIDS specialist
 Minoo Mumtaz (born 1942), former Indian film actress
 Minoo Purshottam (born 1944), Indian playback singer

See also
Minoh, Osaka, city in Osaka Prefecture, Japan
Minoo Island, Iranian island in the Khuzestan province

Urdu feminine given names
Persian feminine given names